The Best of Chicane: 1996–2008 is a greatest hits compilation album by the English music producer Chicane, released by Modena Records and Enzo Records on 6 October 2008.

Background
Tracks 3, 4 and 17 ("No Ordinary Morning", "Don't Give Up" and "Saltwater") are re-recordings as the original sound recordings were still owned by Xtravaganza and were unable to be licensed for this compilation due to a dispute between Chicane and Xtaravagnza boss Alex Gold which dated back to 2002. Chicane's previous Xtravaganza recordings, which had been distributed by Edel Records in 1996/1997, are here in their original form as Xtravaganza lost the rights to those sound recordings. The album was re-released in 2009 to include the song "Poppiholla" which replaced track 12. This song was released as a single on 13 July 2009.

Track listing
 "Offshore" (Original Mix) – 6:58
 "Bruised Water" featuring Natasha Bedingfield (Chicane Rework Mix) – 2:58
 "No Ordinary Morning" – 5:07
 "Don't Give Up" featuring Bryan Adams – 3:28
 "Spirit" featuring Jewel (Chicane Rework Mix) – 2:56
 "Halcyon" (2008 Version) – 7:13
 "Sunstroke" – 3:49
 "Stoned in Love" featuring Tom Jones – 3:38
 "Wake Up" feat. Keane – 6:18
 "Come Tomorrow" (Edit) – 3:32
 "Leaving Town" (Edit) – 3:52
 "Daylight" – 4:20
 "From Blue to Green" (Edit) – 2:38
 "Love on the Run" featuring Peter Cunnah – 3:36
 "Locking Down" (Dead Guys Mix) – 3:03
 "U R Always" (Chicane Rework Mix) – 4:38
 "Saltwater" featuring Máire Brennan – 3:21
 "Early" – 4:19

Charts

References

Chicane (musician) compilation albums
2008 greatest hits albums